He Junyi (born 2 August 1997) is a Chinese swimmer and a national record holder in swimming.

Career 
He represented China at the 2018 Asian Games, which was his first appearance at the Asian Games, and claimed the gold medal in the men's 4 × 100 m medley relay event.

He competed for China at the 2019 World Aquatics Championships. He also took part at the 2019 Military World Games and claimed five medals in the swimming event, including a gold in the men's 4 × 200m freestyle relay event.

Personal bests

Long course (50-meter pool)

Short course (25-meter pool)

References

1997 births
Living people
Chinese male freestyle swimmers
Asian Games gold medalists for China
Asian Games medalists in swimming
Medalists at the 2018 Asian Games
Swimmers at the 2018 Asian Games
Swimmers at the 2020 Summer Olympics
Olympic swimmers of China
21st-century Chinese people